This is the List of municipalities in Aksaray Province, Turkey .

References 

Geography of Aksaray Province
Aksaray